Pothin Poma (born 13 December 1997) is a New Caledonian footballer who plays as a midfielder for Tahitian club Vénus and the New Caledonian national team.

Club career
Poma started his career in the youth of Hienghène Sport. In 2015 he moved to the first team and made his debut. In 2018 he moved to Vénus.

National team
In 2017 Poma was called up for the New Caledonia national football team. He made his debut on November 26, 2017, in a 1–1 draw against Estonia when came in after 80 minutes for Joseph Tchako.

References

New Caledonian footballers
Association football defenders
New Caledonia international footballers
Living people
1997 births
Hienghène Sport players